The Tupolev ANT-37 (or DB-2)  was a Soviet twin-engined long-range bomber designed and built by the Tupolev design bureau, the design team operating under the guidance of Pavel Sukhoi. The aircraft did not enter production, but three examples of the type were used for research and record breaking flights.

Design and development
Based on the unbuilt Tupolev ANT-36 (DB-1) single-engined bomber, the ANT-37 was a twin-engined monoplane of stressed skin, dural construction, fitted with a high-aspect-ratio wing and tailwheel landing gear, the main units retracting into the engine nacelles.

Powered by  Gnome-Rhône 14K radial engines, the prototype first flew on 16 June 1935. The program suffered a setback when the prototype crashed the following month, after the tail splintered into pieces during flight. A re-designed second prototype was built, designated as the DB-2D, in an attempt to overcome the design problems encountered during flight testing, particularly with the tail unit.

It was decided not to order the type into production, the Ilyushin DB-3 being selected for Soviet Air Force service instead.  Despite this, three aircraft were built, designated ANT-37bis (or DB-2B), for research and record breaking purposes. These three aircraft would survive into the 1940s.

Operational history
The first of the three DB-2B aircraft was given the name Rodina ("Motherland"), and, flown by an all female crew (Valentina Grizodubova, Polina Osipenko, and Marina Raskova) between 24 and 25 September 1938, it was used to establish a distance record of  before ending in an emergency landing. This set a world's record for distance flown by a woman crew.

Operators

Aeroflot

Specifications (DB-2)

See also

References
Notes

Bibliography

 Donald, David, ed. The Complete Encyclopedia of World Aircraft. London: Orbis, 1997. .
 Gordon, Yefim and Vladimir Rigmant. OKB Tupolev: A History of the Design Bureau and its Aircraft. Midland, 2006. .
 Higham, Robin, John Greenwood and Von Hardesty. Russian Aviation and Air Power in the Twentieth Century. Routledge, 1998. .

External links

1930s Soviet bomber aircraft
ANT-37
Aircraft first flown in 1935
Low-wing aircraft
Twin piston-engined tractor aircraft